Keith Ferguson may refer to:

Keith Ferguson (voice actor) (born 1972), American voice actor
Keith Ferguson (American football) (born 1959), former American football defensive end
Keith Ferguson (musician) (1946–1997), American bass guitarist
Keith Ferguson (sport shooter), Australian sport shooter